Marek Bartánus (born February 13, 1987) is a Slovak ice hockey player who is currently playing for the HC Košice of the Slovak Extraliga. He was selected by the Tampa Bay Lightning in the 4th round (92nd overall) of the 2005 NHL Entry Draft.

Career
Bartánus played with HC Sparta Praha in the Czech Extraliga during the 2010–11 Czech Extraliga season. He previously played for Owen Sound Attack, HC Košice, HK Poprad and MHK 32 Liptovský Mikuláš.

Career statistics

Regular season and playoffs

International

Awards and honours

References

External links

1987 births
Living people
Sportspeople from Liptovský Mikuláš
Slovak ice hockey right wingers
Tampa Bay Lightning draft picks
HC Košice players
Owen Sound Attack players
HK Poprad players
MHk 32 Liptovský Mikuláš players
HC Sparta Praha players
HC Berounští Medvědi players
HC Karlovy Vary players
HC Slovan Bratislava players
HK 36 Skalica players
HC Vítkovice players
ŠHK 37 Piešťany players
HC Ajoie players
HC '05 Banská Bystrica players
HK Dukla Michalovce players
Slovak expatriate ice hockey players in Canada
Slovak expatriate ice hockey players in the Czech Republic
Slovak expatriate ice hockey players in Switzerland